Oskanluy, also rendered as Oskanlu, may refer to:
 Oskanluy-e Olya
 Oskanluy-e Sofla